Lacertamoeba is a subgenus of the genus Plasmodium — all of which are parasites. All species in this subgenus infect reptiles.

Taxonomy
This subgenus was created by Telford to refine the classification of species then given as Plasmodium tropiduri.

Species 
 Plasmodium arachniformis
 Plasmodium brygooi
 Plasmodium cnemaspi
 Plasmodium fischeri
 Plasmodium floridense
 Plasmodium gologoense
 Plasmodium holaspi
 Plasmodium intabazwe
 Plasmodium lepidoptiformis
 Plasmodium loveridgei
 Plasmodium pitmani
 Plasmodium tanzaniae
 Plasmodium torrealbai
 Plasmodium tropiduri
 Plasmodium uluguruense
 Plasmodium uzungwiense
 Plasmodium vautieri
 Plasmodium zonuriae

Diagnostic features 
Species in the subgenus Lacertamoeba have the following characteristics:The gametocytes are medium-sized
The schizonts undergo 3 to 5 nuclear divisions and are also medium-sized.

References 

Plasmodium subgenera